Battus devilliersii is a species of butterfly from the family Papilionidae that is found in Cuba and the Bahamas.

Description
It has tails on both hindwings. The forewings have a submarginal row of white spots. The hindwing on the upper surface has a submarginal band, and on the underside with one or more silver spots.<ref> Rothschild, W. and Jordan, K. (1906). 
A revision of the American Papilios. Novitates Zoologicae 13: 411-752. (Facsimile edition ed. P.H. Arnaud, 1967).</ref> 

Description from Seitz

P. devilliers Godt. (6a). Hitherto known with certainty only from Cuba; the older authors assigned
it to Florida also, which is perhaps due to an error. Tailed. Forewing with a submarginal row of white
spots ; hind-wing on the upper surface with a submarginal band, and on the under with one or more silver spots.

Biology

The larvae feed on Aristolochia elegans.

References
Edwin Möhn, 2002 Schmetterlinge der Erde, Butterflies of the World Part V (5), Papilionidae II:Battus. Edited by Erich Bauer and Thomas Frankenbach Keltern : Goecke & Evers ; Canterbury : Hillside Books.  Illustrates and identifies 14 species and 49 subspecies.Plate 1, figures 5-8.
Smart, 1976 The Illustrated Encyclopedia of the Butterfly World in Color. London, Salamander:Encyclopedie des papillons''. Lausanne, Elsevier Sequoia (French language edition)   page 158 fig. 12, underside (Cuba).

External links
Butterflycorner Images from Naturhistorisches Museum Wien

devilliersii
Butterflies described in 1823
Papilionidae of South America